The Journal of the American Mathematical Society (JAMS), is a quarterly peer-reviewed mathematical journal published by the American Mathematical Society. It was established in January 1988.

Abstracting and indexing 
This journal is abstracted and indexed in:
 Mathematical Reviews 
 Zentralblatt MATH 
 Science Citation Index 
 ISI Alerting Services 
 CompuMath Citation Index 
 Current Contents/Physical, Chemical & Earth Sciences.

According to the Journal Citation Reports, the journal has a 2020 impact factor of 5.318 , ranking it 2nd out of 330 journals in the category "Mathematics".

See also 
 Bulletin of the American Mathematical Society
 Memoirs of the American Mathematical Society
 Notices of the American Mathematical Society
 Proceedings of the American Mathematical Society
 Transactions of the American Mathematical Society

References

External links 
 

American Mathematical Society academic journals
Mathematics journals
English-language journals
Quarterly journals
Publications established in 1988